Robert Paul Evans, Jr. (born September 3, 1972) is an American professional wrestler and trainer, best known for his work in Ring of Honor (ROH). He also wrestles for various independent circuits.

Professional wrestling career

Independent circuit (1991–present)
In 1991, a year after graduating from Joseph Case High School in Swansea, Massachusetts, Evans debuted for Power League Wrestling. In November 1991, Evans and Maniacal Mark, collectively known as Brutal Brigade, became the first ever PLW World Tag Team Champions. On December 12, they lost the Tag Team Championships to Darkside (Brian Flynn and Shawn Williams). On May 16, 1993, Evans defeated Scott Z. to win the PLW World Championship. In June, Evans vacated the title.

In 2000, Evans debuted for New England Championship Wrestling. On April 27, 2001, Evans defeated Slyk Wagner Brown to win the NECW Heavyweight Championship. On October 26, he lost the Heavyweight Championship to Maverick Wild. On December 1, Evans defeated Maverick Wild and won back the title only to lose it to Alex Arion on March 22, 2002.

World Wrestling Federation/Entertainment (1993, 2000, 2002)
In August 1993, Evans debuted in the World Wrestling Federation on an episode of WWF Wrestling Challenge losing to Adam Bomb.

In 2000, on the August 14 episode of Jakked, Evans returned to the World Wrestling Federation as a jobber in a losing effort to Gangrel. On the October 30 episode of Jakked, Evans teamed with Mike Hollow in a losing effort to Dean Malenko and Perry Saturn.

In early 2002, Evans wrestled in a tryout dark match against Aaron Stevens. It was Stevens' first match in WWF/WWE and he has said that Evans settled him down in that match and it helped him get a developmental contract with the company.

Ring of Honor (2010–2016)

On the December 6 episode of Ring of Honor Wrestling, Evans and his client Mike Bennett appeared in the crowd to watch a match between the ROH World Television Champion Eddie Edwards and Christopher Daniels.

On June 21 tapings of Ring of Honor Wrestling, Evans teamed up with Mike Bennett losing to Adam Cole and Eddie Edwards; after Maria Kanellis slapped Cole, they proceeded to attack Edwards and Cole until “The Queen of Wrestling” Sara Del Rey hit the ring to stop it and attempted to put an ankle lock on Kanellis. On July 28 tapings of Ring of Honor Wrestling, it was later announced Bennett would be teaming with Kanellis to face Sara Del Rey and Eddie Edwards in a mixed tag team match at Boiling Point pay-per-view. At the June 23, 2013, tapings of Ring of Honor Wrestling, Bennett turned on Evans. Evans then formed the Brutal Burgers tag team with Cheeseburger. In March 2015 at an ROH Baltimore TV Taping, Evans turned heel on Cheeseburger, ending their 18-month tag team run. Evans and Cheeseburger would later face each other at Global Wars with the bout ending in a no-contest after Evans put Cheeseburger through a table.

Iron Week
In late 2012, at 40 years old, Bob decided that he would wrestle seven consecutive sixty-minute Iron Man matches, doing so over a seven-day span, referring to this week of events as Iron Week. Viewing it as a way to prove himself, prove he's not just a manager but a viable in ring performer, capable of working a full-time wrestling schedule with ROH (where he worked as a manager).  Bob hand chose his opponents, and began November 25, 2012.
Bob would go on to wrestle over the course of Iron Week; Grizzly Redwood, Todd Sople, Julian Starr, Adam Cole, Biff Busick, Antonio Thomas, and Vinny Marseglia. Winning twice, losing twice, with three draws.

Evans repeated the week in August/Sept 2022, ending the week wrestling Colby Corino on Evans’s 50th birthday.

Championships and accomplishments
Century Wrestling Alliance
NWA New England Television Championship (2 times)
New England Championship Wrestling
NECW Heavyweight Championship (2 times)
	Premier Wrestling Federation
 Mid-Atlantic Masters Championship (1 time)
Power League Wrestling
PLW World Championship (1 time)
PLW World Tag Team Championship (1 time) – with Maniacal Mark
Pro Wrestling Illustrated
PWI ranked him #266 of the 500 best singles wrestlers in the PWI 500 in 2015
The Sanctuary
The Sanctuary Heavyweight Championship (1 time, current)
Jonquiere Championship Wrestling
JCW Tag Team Championship - With Tim Hughes (1 time, current)

References

External links

 Ring of Honor profile
 CageMatch profile 

1972 births
American male professional wrestlers
Living people
People from Swansea, Massachusetts
Professional wrestlers from Massachusetts
Professional wrestling trainers